Aix-en-Ergny is a commune in the Pas-de-Calais department in northern France.

Geography
A small village situated some 20 miles (32 km) southeast of Boulogne-sur-Mer, on the D148E road.

Population

See also
Communes of the Pas-de-Calais department

References

Communes of Pas-de-Calais